Vígľašská Huta-Kalinka is a village and municipality in Detva District, in the Banská Bystrica Region of central Slovakia.

References

External links
http://viglasskahutakalinka.e-obce.sk
http://www.vh-kalinka.cbs.sk

Villages and municipalities in Detva District